Kamasutra is the second studio album by Colombian-American reggaeton singer-songwriter Adassa, released on March 15, 2005, by Universal Music Latino. It is her first commercially successful album.

Album details 
The album includes hits such as "De Tra," "Dejare de Quererte," and "Kamasutra". The song "De Tra" reached No. 40 on Billboard Latin Tropical Airplay chart.

Kamasutra: Coleccion De Lujo 
Kamasutra: Coleccion De Lujo (released on February 17, 2006) is a 2006 re-edition of Kamasutra, on the Deluxe Edition the track list ends on track 15, Vas a Regresar. Tracks 16 through 19 are featured videos from the album.

Track listing

Standard edition 
 "Cada Vez Que Te Veo" (Don Candiani) – 3:11
 "De Tra" (featuring Taino) (Taino & Don Candiani) – 2:50
 "I Got A Thing" (Don Candiani) – 3:34
 "Dadi" (featuring Millomaster) (Emilo Efrain Aldea & Don Candiani) – 3:34
 "Kamasutra" (featuring Pitbull) (Pitbull & Don Candiani) – 3:01
 "Dime Mamacita" (Don Candiani & Sahpreem King) – 3:39
 "Ya No Soy Tu Mujer" (featuring Lisa M) (Lisa M & Don Candiani) – 3:31
 "Dejare de Quererte" (Don Candiani) – 3:35
 "Para Ganarte Mi Amor" (featuring Baby Rasta & Gringo) (Baby Rasta & Don Candiani) – 3:23
 "Tu" (Don Candiani) – 3:49
 "Bang Bang" (Don Candiani) – 3:48
 "Ese Boom" (Don Candiani) – 3:56
 "Dame" (Don Candiani) – 3:15
 "Without You" (Don Candiani) – 3:47
 "Vas a Regresar" (Don Candiani) – 3:55

Kamasutra: Coleccion De Lujo 
 Track #1–15 from standard edition, and includes a DVD.
DVD
 "De Tra (Dance on Me)"
 "Bang Bang"
 "Dame (Gimme – Ninfo's Anthem)"
 "Tu (Heading for Disaster)"

References 

 (standard)
 (deluxe)

2005 albums
Universal Music Latino albums